Argo is an unmanned deep-towed undersea video camera sled developed by Dr. Robert Ballard through Woods Hole Oceanographic Institute's Deep Submergence Laboratory.  Argo is most famous for its role in the discovery of the wreck of the RMS Titanic in 1985. Argo would also play the key role in Ballard's discovery of the wreck of the battleship Bismarck in 1989.

The towed sled, capable of operating depths of 6,000 meters (20,000 feet), meant 98% of the ocean floor was within reach. The original Argo, used to find Titanic, was 15 feet long, 3.5 feet tall, and 3.5 feet wide and weighed about 4,000 pounds in air. It had an array of cameras looking forward and down, as well as strobes and incandescent lighting to illuminate the ocean floor. It could acquire wide-angle film and television pictures while flying 50 to 100 feet above the sea floor, towed from a surface vessel, and could also zoom in for detailed views.

See also 
 Acoustically Navigated Geological Underwater Survey (ANGUS)

References 

Oceanographic instrumentation
Unmanned underwater vehicles